William Smith "Rasty" Wright (January 31, 1863 – October 14, 1922) was a professional baseball player. An outfielder, he played just one season in Major League Baseball, 1890, which he split between two teams. He began the season with the American Association's Syracuse Stars, but was released in August. He then moved on to the Cleveland Spiders to finish the season.

Wright also had an extensive minor league baseball career, spanning sixteen seasons. He began his professional career with Muskegon in the Northwestern League in 1884, and played until 1899, which he spent with the Paterson Giants and Buffalo Bisons. He also managed the Grand Rapids Gold Bugs in 1894-95 and the Paterson Giants in 1899. He is "probably (the) first player to collect 2,000 hits in (the) minor leagues."

Sources

Major League Baseball outfielders
Syracuse Stars (AA) players
Cleveland Spiders players
Muskegon (minor league baseball) players
Toledo Avengers players
Hamilton Clippers players
Hamilton Hams players
Syracuse Stars (minor league baseball) players
Detroit Wolverines (minor league) players
Omaha Lambs players
St. Paul Apostles players
Duluth Whalebacks players
Los Angeles Seraphs players
Los Angeles Angels (minor league) players
Grand Rapids Rippers players
Grand Rapids Gold Bugs players
Newark Colts players
Wilkes-Barre Coal Barons players
Grand Rapids Cabinet Makers players
Paterson Giants players
Buffalo Bisons (minor league) players
Minor league baseball managers
Baseball players from Michigan
People from Birmingham, Michigan
19th-century baseball players
1863 births
1922 deaths